Lleyton Hewitt was the defending champion and won in the final 7–6(7–3), 7–6(7–3) against Tim Henman.

Seeds
The top eight seeds received a bye to the second round.

  Marat Safin (third round)
  Pete Sampras (semifinals)
  Lleyton Hewitt (champion)
  Tim Henman (final)
  Thomas Enqvist (second round)
  Jan-Michael Gambill (quarterfinals)
  Wayne Ferreira (semifinals)
  Vladimir Voltchkov (third round)
  Andreas Vinciguerra (first round)
  Harel Levy (first round)
  Andy Roddick (first round)
  Greg Rusedski (quarterfinals)
  Cédric Pioline (second round)
  Magnus Gustafsson (second round)
  Davide Sanguinetti (first round)
  Wayne Arthurs (third round)

Draw

Finals

Top half

Section 1

Section 2

Bottom half

Section 3

Section 4

External links
 2001 Stella Artois Championships draw

2001 Stella Artois Championships